The huge moth family Noctuidae contains the following genera:

A B C D E F G H I J K L M N O P Q R S T U V W X Y Z

Zacthys
Zagira
Zagorista
Zalaca
Zale
Zaleodes
Zaleops
Zalissa
Zanclognatha
Zanclopalpus
Zanclostathme
Zarima
Zatilpa
Zazanisa
Zebeeba
Zekelita
Zelicodes
Zellerminia
Zenomia
Zeteolyga
Zethes
Zethesides
Zeuxinia
Ziela
Zigera
Zinna
Zirona
Zitna
Ziza
Zobia
Zonoplusia
Zophochroa
Zorothis
Zorzines
Zosichrysia
Zosteropoda
Zotheca
Zurobata
Zutragum

References 

 Natural History Museum Lepidoptera genus database

 
Noctuid genera Z